Sar-e Gaz-e Ahmadi (also Romanized as Sar-e Gaz-e Aḩmadī; also known as Sar-e Gaz-e Bālā, Sargaz, and Sargaz-e Bāla) is a village in Ahmadi Rural District, Ahmadi District, Hajjiabad County, Hormozgan Province, Iran. At the 2006 census, its population was 886, in 201 families.

References 

Populated places in Hajjiabad County